Ride wit Us or Collide wit Us is the debut album by  rap group Outlawz,  not counting their collaborative Still I Rise. It was released on November 7, 2000, on Outlaw Recordz and Bayside Entertainment.

Track listing

Album chart positions

References

External links 
 
 

2000 debut albums
Outlawz albums
Albums produced by E.D.I.
Albums produced by Mike Dean (record producer)
Outlaw Recordz albums
Gangsta rap albums by American artists